Cecil "Bill" Payn was born in Harding, Colony of Natal on 9 August 1893. He was a Springbok rugby player. He matriculated at Maritzburg College in Pietermaritzburg, Natal, South Africa. He played as a flanker. He was more commonly known as "Bill". He died on 31 October 1959, in Durban, Natal,  South Africa

Personal

He was born to James  and Ellie (née  Zietsman).  He was a school teacher and married Winifred Ashton. Payn taught at Durban High School from 1915 to 1953. During world war two he was captured in Benghazi, Libya and served time in the Prisoner of War camps in Italy and Poland.

Rugby

He played rugby for Natal and the Springboks. He made his International South Africa  test debut on 16 August 1924, on the Kingsmead stadium  in Durban, Natal South Africa  playing as a flanker. This was a game between the Springboks and Great Britain. The Springboks  won 7–3. He went on to play the next test against Great Britain as well, which was also his last. Payn's last test we played on 23 August 1924 at the Wanderers Stadium,  Johannesburg, Transvaal, South Africa. The Springboks won 17–0.

Other sport participation

He was a right arm slow bowler, who played cricket for his Province Natal. He ran the Comrades Ultra Marathon in 1922, and came 8th in this race, which was an up run held on 24 May 1922. His finishing time for the 90 km was 10:56:00. He ran the race in his rugby boots.

References 

South African rugby union players
1893 births
1959 deaths
South Africa international rugby union players
Rugby union flankers
People from Durban
South African military personnel of World War II
South African prisoners of war
World War II prisoners of war held by Germany
Sharks (rugby union) players
KwaZulu-Natal cricketers
South African cricketers